The Heide Express (literally: "Heath Express") is the name used by the Lüneburg Transport Society (Arbeitsgemeinschaft Verkehrsfreunde Lüneburg) or AVL to market special railway trips with their historic trains on the East Hanoverian Railways (OHE) railway network in northern Germany.

Activities 

In addition to running special trains, the society organises presentations, model railway swapmeets, film showings and exhibitions, usually in Lüneburg. These are accompanied by excursions.

Operations today 

The Heide Express operates today on the OHE lines around Lüneburg, Winsen, Soltau and Celle as well as Walsrode. Services operate irregularly several times a year and, in the summer months for special occasions. There are no regular weekend services as, for example, on the Moor Express.

The following routes are operated:
Winsen (Luhe)–Niedermarschacht (with bus connexions to the Geesthacht Railway Society)
Winsen (Luhe)–Salzhausen–Hützel
Lüneburg–Bleckede (–Waldfrieden)
Lüneburg Süd–Amelinghausen–Hützel (some run to Soltau)
Celle–Hankensbüttel–Wittingen
Celle–Beckedorf–Hermannsburg–Müden (Örtze)
Walsrode–Bomlitz
Walsrode–Altenboitzen

In cooperation with other societies the AVL's rolling stock is used for special trains on other lines. They appear regularly in the Hamburg region.

Rolling stock 

The AVL's rolling stock is used in various combinations. The Heide Express trains are mainly hauled by the V46-01 (from Lüneburg) or the DL 0601 (from Winsen) using train rakes composed of Umbauwagen and platform coaches, or they just use the GDT 0518 railbus.

Locomotives and railbuses

Passenger coaches

Goods wagons and special wagons 

Some services also use locomotives owned by the East Hanoverian Railways. This is especially the case for trips in the Celle area.

External links 
http://www.heide-express.de (official web site)
List of rolling stock
http://heidebahn.de (Information about railways on the Lüneburg Heath)

References 

Heritage railways in Germany
Transport in Lower Saxony